Steelhead Beach Regional Park is a regional park on the Russian River north of Forestville, California, U.S.A. that is maintained by the Sonoma County Regional Parks Department. The day use fee is $7 per vehicle.

Features
The park features a river beach suitable for fishing, a small craft launching area, picnic areas, and restrooms.

See also
 List of Sonoma County Regional Parks facilities

References

External links

Parks in Sonoma County, California
Regional parks in California
Beaches of Sonoma County, California